The 2009 Open Costa Adeje – Isla de tenerife was a professional tennis tournament played on hard courts. It was part of the 2009 ATP Challenger Tour. It took place in Tenerife, Spain, between April 27 and March 3, 2009.

Singles entrants

Seeds

 Rankings are as of April 20, 2009.

Other entrants
The following players received wildcards into the singles main draw:
  Javier Martí
  Javier Padilla
  Narciso Reyes-Rygh
  Amador Romero-Torres

The following players received entry from the qualifying draw:
  Marco Chiudinelli
  Matthew Ebden
  Jean-Noel Insausti
  Filip Prpic

Champions

Men's singles

 Marco Chiudinelli def.  Paolo Lorenzi, 6–3, 6–4

Men's doubles

 Philipp Petzschner /  Alexander Peya def.  James Auckland /  Joshua Goodall, 6–2, 3–6, [10–4]

External links
Official website
ITF search 
2009 Draws